The Show! Music Core Chart is a record chart on the South Korean MBC television music program Show! Music Core. Every week, the show awards the best-performing single on the chart in the country during its live broadcast.

In 2020, 18 singles have ranked at number one on the chart and 15 music acts received first-place trophies. No release for the year achieved a perfect score, but "Life Goes On" by BTS acquired the highest point total on the December 5 broadcast with 11,881 points. The English language single "Dynamite" by BTS achieved number 1 for 10 consecutive weeks becoming the longest consecutive number 1 song, and the artist with the most wins was BTS at 18 wins.

Scoring system

Chart history

See also 
List of Show! Music Core Chart winners (2021)

Notes

References 

2020 in South Korean music
2020 record charts
Lists of number-one songs in South Korea